Maria Petronella "Puck" Oversloot (22 May 1914 – 7 January 2009) was a Dutch swimmer. Together with Marie Braun, she was the top national backstroke and freestyle competitor. At the 1932 Summer Olympics, Braun was listed for the 4 × 100 m freestyle relay, but fell ill and was replaced by Oversloot. The team won a silver medal, setting a new European record. Both Braun and Oversloot qualified for 400 m freestyle semifinals, but because Braun could not participate, Oversloot withdrew from the event, in solidarity.

In 1933, Oversloot broke the national record in 100 m backstroke set by Braun and became the national champion. She won a bronze medal in the same event at the 1934 European Aquatics Championships.

She was born and died in Rotterdam.

References

1914 births
2009 deaths
Dutch female freestyle swimmers
Dutch female backstroke swimmers
Olympic swimmers of the Netherlands
Swimmers at the 1932 Summer Olympics
Olympic silver medalists for the Netherlands
Swimmers from Rotterdam
European Aquatics Championships medalists in swimming
Medalists at the 1932 Summer Olympics
Olympic silver medalists in swimming
20th-century Dutch women